Dukkipati Madhusudhana Rao (27 July 1917 – 26 March 2006) was an Indian film producer and screenwriter, known for his works in  Telugu cinema. He owned the film production houses named Annapurna Pictures Limited based in Chennai. As a producer, he garnered four National Film Awards and three Nandi Awards. He was awarded the Raghupathy Venkaiah award by the State Government of Andhra Pradesh for his contribution to Telugu cinema in 1993.

Awards
National Film Award
National Film Award for Best Feature Film in Telugu (producer)
Thodi Kodallu (1957)
Mangalya Balam (1958)
Doctor Chakravarthy (1964)

Nandi Awards
Third Best Feature Film - Bronze - Aatma Gowravam (1965)
Second Best Feature Film - Silver - Athmeeyulu (1969)
Third Best Feature Film - Bronze - Amaayakuraalu (1971)
Raghupathi Venkaiah Award for lifetime achievement - 1993

Filmography
As producer

1987 America Abbayi
1982 Pelleedu Pillalu
1978 Radha Krishna
1977 Prema Lekhalu
1974 Bangaaru Kalalu
1972 Vichitra Bandham
1971 Amayakuralu
1970 Jai Jawan
1969 AatmiyuluAatmiyulu
1967 Poola Rangadu
1965 Aatma Gowravam
1964 Doctor Chakravarty
1963 Chaduvukunna Ammayilu
1961 Iddaru Mitrulu
1961 Velugu Needalu
1959 Mangalya Balam
1957 Todi Kodallu
1955 Donga Ramudu

As writer
1963 Chaduvukunna Ammayilu
1962 Man-MaujiMan-Mauji
1958 Mangalya Balam
1957 Todi Kodallu
1955 Donga Ramudu

See also
 Raghupathi Venkaiah Award

References

Telugu film producers
1917 births
2006 deaths
Screenwriters from Andhra Pradesh
Telugu screenwriters
20th-century Indian dramatists and playwrights
Film producers from Andhra Pradesh
20th-century Indian screenwriters